The Statute Law (Repeals) Act 1989 (c 43) is an Act of the Parliament of the United Kingdom.

This Act was partly in force in Great Britain at the end of 2010.

It implemented recommendations contained in the thirteenth report on statute law revision, by the Law Commission and the Scottish Law Commission.

Section 3 - Short title and commencement
The Statute Law (Repeals) Act 1989 (Commencement) Order 1992 (SI 1992/1275) (C 40) was made under section 3(2).

Schedule 2

Part I
Paragraph 3 was repealed by section 73(3) of, and Part I of Schedule 6 to, the Justices of the Peace Act 1997.

Paragraph 4 was repealed by section 109(3) of, and Schedule 10 to, the Courts Act 2003.

Part II
Paragraph 7 was repealed by section 423 of, and Part V of Schedule 34 to, the Greater London Authority Act 1999.

Paragraph 13 was repealed by section 17(2) of, and Part I of Schedule 2 to, the British Technology Group Act 1991.

See also
Statute Law (Repeals) Act

References
Halsbury's Statutes. Fourth Edition. 2008 Reissue. Volume 41. Page 891.
Peter Allsop (Editor emeritus). Scottish Current Law Statutes Annotated 1989. Sweet and Maxwell, Stevens & sons. London. W Green & son. Edinburgh. 1990. Volume 4.
The Public General Acts 1989. HMSO. London. 1990. Part III. Page 2387.
HL Deb vol 508, cols 945 and 1266 to 1268, vol 509, col 966, vol 510, col 263, HC Deb vol 159, col 1290.

External links
The Statute Law (Repeals) Act 1989, as originally enacted, from the National Archives.

United Kingdom Acts of Parliament 1989